Good Witch is a Hallmark Channel media franchise that is centered on a series of films and a television series. The franchise is centered upon Cassandra "Cassie" Nightingale (Catherine Bell), the titular "good witch" who uses her abilities to bring positive change in the lives of those around her.

The franchise was launched with the 2008 film The Good Witch, which aired on the Hallmark Channel on January 19, 2008. It has since been followed with six additional movies and a television series that has run for seven seasons.

Cast 
 A dark grey cell indicates the character was not in the film or the series season/special.

Films
The Good Witch films are composed of seven films spanning from 2008 through 2014, after which Hallmark opted to continue the storyline via a television series.

The Good Witch

The Good Witch premiered on the Hallmark Channel on January 19, 2008, and starred Catherine Bell as Cassandra "Cassie" Nightingale and Chris Potter as Chief of Police Jake Russell.

The movie centers upon Cassie, a new arrival to the town of Middleton. She immediately catches the attention of the people around her, particularly Jake, who becomes enamored with her. Cassie also attracts negative attention from Martha Tinsdale, who believes that she is practicing black magic.

The movie had great success on Hallmark Channel on the night of its premiere, making it the second-highest-rated original movie to that date. It premiered with a 3.8 HH (household) rating and was in nearly 3.2 million homes. It also was #1 in its time period, propelling the channel to the #4 spot in weekly ranking.

The Good Witch's Garden

The Good Witch's Garden premiered on the Hallmark Channel on February 7, 2009. The film's premise centers on Cassie, who is turning her home into a bed and breakfast. Strife comes when a suspicious stranger, Nick, comes into town claiming to be the actual owner of her home, Grey House. Nick claims that it is his birthright, as he is the descendant of the home's original owner, the Grey Lady, and her lover, a captain. Over the course of the film it's proven that the captain was only a fictional creation and that Nick is a grifter who had run similar cons on other homeowners. The film ends with Jake proposing to Cassie.

The film's premiere did moderately well for Hallmark Channel.  It scored a 2.7 household rating with over 2.3 million homes, over 3.1 million total viewers and 4.2 million unduplicated viewers.  This performance ranked it #1 in the time period as well as the second-highest-rated Prime Time cable movie of the week and day, among all ad-supported cable networks.  The film boosted Hallmark Channel to rank #3 in prime time for the day, and #5 for the week.

The Good Witch's Gift
The Good Witch's Gift premiered on November 13, 2010, and is the third installment in the Hallmark Channel's series of Good Witch television films. The film had a 3.8 HH rating and nearly 3.2 million homes. The film's premise centers on the wedding of Cassie and Jake.

Cassie Nightingale has settled comfortably in Middleton with a successful boutique and is now engaged to Chief of Police Russell (Chris Potter). Having gifts for everyone else, finding one for Cassie proves to be a little more tricky for Jake. He sets his heart on letting Cassie wake up with a family on Christmas Day after getting married on Christmas Eve. With 7 days to go, everyone gets involved in the planning. Martha Tinsdale, who is looking for a job after her husband announces they're broke, discovers her talent for planning weddings. She eventually overcomes her struggles not to let her own vision undermine the bride-to-be's. Betty, the owner of a local bakery, is in charge of the menu, including the cake, and comes out more confident after Cassie gives her a necklace. As the chief of police, Jake Russell has additional concerns, as Leon Deeks, a man he put in jail for robbing a bank 10 years ago, got out of prison early. The money that was stolen had never been found. Leon appears at his former home. His daughter Jody is happy to see him, but his wife has filed for divorce and kicks him out. Jody is in a relationship with Brandon and the two of them visit Cassie's shop. Lori has been left to look after it for a bit and has been put in charge of Cassie's wedding ring, the last thing Cassie still owns from her mother. After the three of them talk for a bit, Jody suddenly has to leave. Immediately after, Lori notices the ring's gone missing. She feels horrible about losing it. Lori suspects Jody to be involved in the ring's disappearance and visits her at home. Before she can ring the doorbell, Brandon sees Lori and accuses her of harboring preconceived notions of Jody only due to the prior indiscretions of her father. He continues to get mad at anyone suspecting Jody. They later find out that Martha, who had previously been in the shop, had accidentally put it in her purse. Problems continue when the marriage certificate is first difficult to acquire, then gets switched up by accident, only to be followed by the minister's car breaking down and a dog eating the wedding cake. George considers moving to Montreal, but Cassie makes him want to stay and move into Grey House after she moves in with Jake after the wedding. He welcomes his new job as a caretaker for the property. All other problems are resolved just in time for the wedding. Leon retrieves the robbery money from underneath the tiles in Cassie's shop, where he had hidden it back when it had still been an abandoned building, and returns it to Jake. He decides to stay in Middleton to regain peoples' trust and his family decides to give him a second chance. Cassie wakes up the next morning with a family.

The Good Witch's Family

The Good Witch's Family premiered on the Hallmark Channel on October 29, 2011, and is the fourth film in the series. The film follows Cassie as she must deal with new threats to the wellbeing of her family, friends, and community.

Critical reception for the film was positive and actor Matthew Knight received a 2012 Young Artist Awards nomination for "Best Performance in a TV Movie, Miniseries or Special - Supporting Young Actor" for his role as Brandon Russell.

The Good Witch's Charm
The Good Witch's Charm aired on the Hallmark Channel on October 27, 2012. Bell and Potter reprised their roles as Cassie and Jake, respectively.

The film focused on Cassie's life as she acclimates to caring for her newborn while also serving as her town's mayor. She's hoping to get a break from her hectic life and take a vacation with her husband Jake and their new family, however this plan is ruined when her stepdaughter is blamed for a recent rash of robberies. A reporter has also arrived in town with the seeming goal of ruining Cassie's reputation, and Cassie's own estranged mother has suddenly arrived in town as well.

The Good Witch's Destiny

The Good Witch's Destiny premiered on Hallmark Channel October 26, 2013 and is the sixth film in the series. Its premiere was watched by 2.82 million viewers and was the channel's most watched original movie to date for 2013 among the network's core demographic, women aged 25–54.

The film's plot centers on Cassie's birthday and her stepdaughter Lori's investigation into Cassie's great aunt who disappeared many years ago.

The Good Witch's Wonder
The Good Witch's Wonder is the seventh film in the Good Witch film series. It premiered on the Hallmark Channel on October 25, 2014. The film is the last one to star Chris Potter, as he was unable to reprise his character due to scheduling conflicts.

In its original airing on the Hallmark Channel, The Good Witch's Wonder was watched by 2.49 million viewers and had a 0.3 rating among adults aged 18 to 49.

Television series

In February 2014, the Hallmark Channel announced that Good Witch had been green-lighted for a ten-episode series, starring Catherine Bell, to premiere on February 28, 2015. Production for the first season began on October 29, 2014, in Toronto, with Sue Tenney as showrunner. Bailee Madison and James Denton also star. Five further two-hour films, promoted as special episodes, have also aired from 2015 to 2019 in the weeks before Halloween.

Ratings
The table below shows the ratings for the Good Witch films. Ratings for the films and the subsequent television series have been generally favorable.

Films

Television

Home video releases

Box sets

References

External links
 
 The Good Witch Movies on Hallmark Channel
 

 
American fantasy films
Canadian fantasy films
Television franchises
Canadian television films
English-language Canadian films
Films shot in Hamilton, Ontario
Hallmark Channel original films
Films about witchcraft
American fantasy drama television series